Wilfred (Billie) Nevill (14 July 1894 – 1 July 1916) was an officer attached to the East Surrey Regiment in the First World War. He became famous as the officer who kicked a football into No Man's Land at the start of the Battle of the Somme. He was promptly killed in action while leading an assault on a German position.

Early life 
Wilfred Percy Nevill was born at Canonbury Park in London on 14 July 1894 to a coal merchant father. He was one of four brothers and three sisters, raised at homes in Westgate-on-Sea and Twickenham.

He went to school at Dover College, where he was head prefect as well as captain of the cricket and hockey teams. He also played in the 1st XV for the rugby team and ran in the running team first team.

After completing his studies at Dover he went up to Jesus College, Cambridge in 1913 to study the Classical Tripos. He demonstrated his sporting abilities at university, playing hockey for the college. An annual report from the period states that Nevill was “only one freshman worthy of his colours”.

The Jesus College magazine, The Chanticlere, describes Nevill's style of play - 

Nevill had been at Cambridge University for a year when war was declared. In that year he had enjoyed trips by motorcycle, watched Wimbledon tennis champion A.F. Wilding in and exhibition match and witnessed Gustav Hamel flying over the city.

First World War 
Prior to the war Nevill was a member of the Cambridge University Officer Training Corp and attended the 1914 summer training camp at Mytchett. He enlisted in November 1914 and was promoted to Captain and signed up to service with the regular army.

Writing to his sister just prior to the Battle of the Somme, Nevill describes his experience of being under artillery bombardment:

Battle of the Somme 

Nevill joined the East Yorkshire Regiment but transferred to the East Surrey Regiment and was the originator of the East Surrey’s famous “Football Charge” on the first day of the Battle of the Somme, 1 July 1916.

On the first day of the Battle of the Somme, the 8th Battalion Royal East Surrey Regiment left their trenches at Carnoy to attack the German position at Montauban 300 yards away. There were some reports that four balls were used, one for each company of the 8th Battalion. However, historians conclude that the evidence available points to there only being two used.

Nevill and his fellow officers were concerned about how their men would behave when finally called on to go over the top. To provide his soldiers with a reassuringly familiar symbol, Nevill bought the footballs while on leave in London and took them back with him to France.

A fellow officer, Second Lieutenant C.W. Alcock, wrote to Nevill's sister -

Nevill died on the first day of the Battle of the Somme, just two weeks short of his 22nd birthday. He fell in front of the German barbed wire, shot as he was about to throw a hand grenade.

Alcock in writing to Nevill's sister, said of her brother -

Writing to Nevill's mother, Major A.P.B. Irwin paid this tribute -

Nevill rests at Carnoy Military Cemetery (grave ref. E.28) under the care of the Commonwealth War Graves Commission.

Press coverage 
"Touchstone" of The Daily Mail penned the following verse in tribute:
On through the hail of slaughter,
Where gallant comrades fall,
Where blood is poured like water,
They drive the trickling ball.
The fear of death before them,
Is but an empty name;
True to the land that bore them,
The SURREYS played the game.

The Daily Telegraph of 12 July 1916 ran the headline, GALLANT EAST SURREYS. A CHARGE WITH FOOTBALLS and gave the following account -

Relics 
One of Neville's Somme footballs is currently displayed at the Princess of Wales's Royal Regiment Museum at Dover Castle. The other is believed lost after a fire the Queen's Royal Surrey Regimental Museum at Clandon Park, Guildford in 2015.

References

Further reading 
Dover College Register

Chart Sutton schoolboy George Majin finds rare World War I football used to 'attack' German trenches http://www.edp24.co.uk/news/chart_sutton_schoolboy_george_majin_finds_rare_wwi_football_used_to_attack_german_trenches_1_934830

East Surrey Regiments' 'football' charge July 1, 1916

http://www.exploringsurreyspast.org.uk/themes/subjects/military/east_surrey_regiments_football_charge_july_1st_1916

1894 births
1916 deaths
British military personnel killed in the Battle of the Somme
Military personnel from London
People from Canonbury
East Surrey Regiment officers
People educated at Dover College
Alumni of Jesus College, Cambridge
British Army personnel of World War I
People from Twickenham
People from Westgate-on-Sea